Asamati is a village in the Resen Municipality of North Macedonia, on the northeastern shore of Lake Prespa.

History
Asamati is home to several archaeological sites, dating from various historical eras, most of which were discovered by accident. Many of the findings from the sites, such as pithos and roof tiles, are housed at the Saraj in Resen.

In the 19th century, the population of the village, listed then as "Adamite", consisted of 16 households with 30 Muslim inhabitants and 16 Macedonian. In 1905, Asamati had 150 inhabitants, of which 102 were Muslim Albanians and the remainder were Bulgarian Exarchists.

During World War I, the village had 115 residents.

Demographics
The population of Asamati is ethnically mixed, consisting of Orthodox Macedonians living alongside Muslim Sunni and Bektashi Albanians, of whom the latter are known locally as Kolonjarë. It is the only village in the municipality with no majority ethnic group.

Gallery

People from Asamati
Eftim Dimitrov (1867 - ?), member of the Macedonian-Adrianopolitan Volunteer Corps
Taip Taipi (1924 - 2001), politician

References

Villages in Resen Municipality
Albanian communities in North Macedonia